Kathleen Mary Fitzwilliam (1826–1894) was an English actress and singer appearing regularly on the London stage in the mid 19th century.

Early life 
Kathleen Fitzwilliam was born in Covent Garden, England, the daughter of the noted actors Edward Fitzwilliam and Fanny Fitzwilliam. Her parents were both of Irish descent. 

She attended the Convent in Hammersmith as a boarder.

Musical Education
She studied under John Barnett (singing), John Liptrot Hatton  (piano) and Balzir Chatterton (harp). Her first appearance in public was on 15 March 1845 at the Hanover Square Rooms as a singer on the occasion of the first performance of an original 'Stabat Mater' composed by her brother  Edward Francis Fitzwilliam. In the same year she made her stage debut at the Theatre Royal, Birmingham as Rosina in The Barber of Seville.

Career
Fitzwilliam's first appearance on the London stage was on 1 December 1847 at the Lyceum Theatre where she played the title role in Peggy Green which was written expressly for her by Charles Selby. She remained at the Lyceum for three seasons appearing in James Planché's extravaganzas. 

Miss Fitzwilliam appeared with many notable Victorian actors. She played Ophelia with William Macready in Hamlet and appeared as Maud in The Wife's Secret with Mr and Mrs Charles Kean. On the return of Miss Fanny Kemble from America , Miss Fitzwilliam played Helen in The Hunchback in Liverpool  (1847) to Miss Kemble's Julia.

In 1849 she performed for Queen Victoria at Windsor Castle in the Christmas theatricals.
In 1850 (January) Miss Fitzwilliam joined the company of the Theatre Royal Haymarket, under Mr. Benjamin Webster's management, and shortly afterwards transferred her services to the Adelphi Theatre, where she remained for three seasons.

Retirement 
Miss Fitzwilliam made her last appearance on the stage in August 1852 in Bon Soir, Signor Pantalon at the Adelphi Theatre, and then adopted concert singing as a profession. From 1852 until early in 1854 she sang with much success at most of the concerts and musical reunions in London and at several in the principal towns of the provinces. In May 1854 she married and left the profession.

Notable parts - London

Lyceum Theatre, London 
 Margaret Honeyball in 'Anything For A Change' by Shirley Brooks
 Anne Page in 'The Merry Wives of Windsor' 
 Polly Peachum in a revival of 'The Beggar's Opera'. 15 June 1848 with Madame Vestris

Planché's Extravaganzas at the Lyceum
 Prince Humpy in The Golden Branch 
 Prince Florizel in The King of the Peacocks
 Ariadne in Theseus and Ariadne
 St George in The Seven Champions of Christendom

Theatre Royal, Drury Lane 
 Polly Peachum -  'The Beggar's Opera' July 1849 with Madame Vestris and Sims Reeves for the benefit of James Kenney (dramatist) who died the same evening.

Theatre Royal Haymarket 
 Several performances under Mr. Benjamin Webster's management

Adelphi Theatre 
 Three seasons, playing original parts in 
 Columbine in Good Night, Signor Pantalon (23 Sep 1851-2 Jun 1852) 
 Fiametta in Mephistopheles; or, An Ambassador from Below! (14 Apr 1852-31 Jul 1852) 
 Giralda in Giralda; or, The Miller's Wife (23 Sep 1851-1 Oct 1851) 
 Laurette Seymour in My Little Adopted (2 Jun 1852) 
 Mary Thorncliffe in Sea and Land (17 May 1852-10 Jul 1852) 
 Mrs. Bounce in Bloomerism; or, The Follies of the Day (2 Oct 1851-23 Dec 1851) 
 Trudchen in Little Red Riding Hood (26 Dec 1851-20 Mar 1852)
 Esmeralda
 Jessie Gray
 The Tarantula

Windsor Castle Theatricals 1849
 Endiga in 'Charles The Twelfth' singing 'Rise Gentle Moon' in the  Rubens' Room 
 The Queen, through Mr Charles Kean, sent a message to the actress, saying how pleased Her Majesty had been with the song, and expressing appreciation of " the admirable way in which Miss Fitzwilliam had accomplished, what must have been, a very difficult task."

Notable parts - Provinces
 Ophelia in Hamlet with William Macready
 Maud in The Wife's Secret with Mr and Mrs Charles Kean
 Helen to Fanny Kemble's Julia in The Hunchback in Liverpool.
 Several important pieces with Miss Cushman

References

1826 births
1894 deaths